The Gasport Formation is a geologic formation in Ontario. It preserves fossils dating back to the Silurian period.

See also

 List of fossiliferous stratigraphic units in Ontario

References
 

Silurian Ontario
Silurian southern paleotemperate deposits